The 13th running of the Omloop Het Nieuwsblad women's race in Belgium was held on 24 February 2018. Widely regarded as the start of the Classics season, it was a 1.1 event of the women's international calendar. The race started in Ghent and, for the first time, finished in Ninove.

Danish rider Christina Siggaard claimed a surprise win in the sprint of a 25-strong group. American Alexis Ryan finished second, Italian Maria Giulia Confalonieri third.

Teams
Twenty-four teams participated in the race. Each team had a maximum of six riders:

Results

See also
 2018 in women's road cycling

References

Omloop Het Nieuwsblad – Women's race
Omloop Het Nieuwsblad
Omloop Het Nieuwsblad